Killer Caliber .32  (also known as 32 Caliber Killer) is a 1967 Italian Spaghetti Western film written and directed by Alfonso Brescia and starring Peter Lee Lawrence.

Plot
Silver kills the seven members of a masked gang, one by one. Saloon girls and poker games enliven this action-packed movie which culminates in the unmasking of the evil gang's boss.

Cast 

 Peter Lee Lawrence as Silver
 Agnès Spaak as  Beth
 Hélène Chanel as  Doll 
 Andrea Bosic as  Averell 
 Mirko Ellis as  Sheriff Bear 
 John Bartha as Parker
 Silvio Bagolini as Old Man
 Michael Bolt as  Carruthers
 Alberto Dell'Acqua as  Spot Averell 
  Massimo Righi as Jud
 Nello Pazzafini as  Fitch

See also
 List of Italian films of 1967

References

External links

Spaghetti Western films
1967 Western (genre) films
1967 films
Films directed by Alfonso Brescia
1960s Italian-language films
1960s Italian films